İbrahim Karagül (born 1969 in Sinlice, Salpazari, Trabzon) is a Turkish journalist and a former editor in chief of the newspaper Yeni Safak.

Education and early life 
He attended primary school in Sinlice, secondary education he received in Rize, Ordu and Trabzon. He graduated from the Imam Hatip school in Trabzon. He studied law at the Dokuz Eylül University in Izmir. Since his student years, he worked in various media and worked as foreign news editor. He also stayed in Malaysia for a while, and translated a novel of the Malaysian author Şahnun Ahmed into Turkish.

Professional career 
Karagül started working in Yeni Şafak newspaper in 1995, and is known for his articles and columns focusing on foreign politics. He was appointed as the general editor of  television in 2011. Then in July 2012, Karagül was appointed  the editor-in-chief of Yeni Şafak of the Albayrak holding. During his tenure the newspaper turned into an outlet which staunchly supported the Turkish Government around Recep Tayyip Erdoğan. His articles are often cited in the international press as he claims that the USA attempted to kill the Turkish president Erdogan supported the Turkish offensive in North-East Syria or accused foreign brokers of leading an attack against Turkey by the means of financial terrorism. He also assumed that Turkey is under attack by the USA who allegedly unleashed the Kurdistan Workers' Party (PKK) and the Islamic State of Iraq and the Levant (ISIL) on Turkey. During the Nagorno Karabakh conflict between Azerbaijan and Armenians, he insinuated that missiles should hit the city center of Yerevan "accidentally". Karagül resigned from Yeni Safak in December 2020.

Wildfires controversy 
As in August 2021 he claimed that the Republican Peoples' Party (CHP) and the PKK were behind the raging wild fires, the CHP filed a criminal complaint against him.

Personal life 
Karagül is married and has two children.

References 

Turkish journalists
1969 births
People from Trabzon Province
Living people